Covassi is an Italian surname.

People with the surname 

 Beatrice Covassi (born 1968), Italian politician
 Claude Covassi (1970–2013), Swiss criminal

See also 

 Kumasi

Italian-language surnames